Pilar Lucrecia Cordón Muro (born 4 March 1973) is a Spanish Olympic show jumping rider. She competed at the 2016 Summer Olympics in Rio de Janeiro, Brazil, where she placed 11th in the team and 46th in the individual competition.

References 

Living people
1973 births
Equestrians at the 2016 Summer Olympics
Spanish female equestrians
Olympic equestrians of Spain